Nikolai Semyonovich Rabinovich (7 October 1908- 26 July 1972) was a Russian conductor and teacher.

Rabinovich studied under Nikolai Malko and graduated from the Leningrad Conservatory in 1931, becoming a professor in 1968. He trained a series of notable conductors including Yuri Simonov, Neeme Järvi, Vladislav Chachin, Vitaliy Kutsenko, and Victor Yampolsky.

He was director of the Mikhaylovsky Theatre 1944–1948.

Discography
 Legendary Conductors - Nikolai Rabinovich. Berlioz, Shostakovich, Mozart.

References

1908 births
1972 deaths
Saint Petersburg Conservatory alumni
20th-century Russian conductors (music)
Russian male conductors (music)
20th-century Russian male musicians